Clathrus hainanensis is a species of fungus in the stinkhorn family. Found in Hainan, China, it was described as new to science in 1998.

References

Phallales
Fungi of Asia
Fungi described in 1998